The 112th United States Congress was a meeting of the legislative branch of the United States federal government, from January 3, 2011, until January 3, 2013. It convened in Washington, D.C. on January 3, 2011, and ended on January 3, 2013, 17 days before the end of the presidential term to which Barack Obama was elected in 2008. Senators elected to regular terms in 2006 completed those terms in this Congress. This Congress included the last House of Representatives elected from congressional districts that were apportioned based on the 2000 census.

In the 2010 midterm elections, the Republican Party won the majority in the House of Representatives. While the Democrats kept their Senate majority, it was reduced from the previous Congress.

This was the first Congress in which the House and Senate were controlled by different parties since the 107th Congress (2001–2003), and the first Congress to begin that way since the 99th Congress (1985–1987). It was also the first Congress since the 36th Congress, over 150 years, in which the Republican Party held the House but not the Senate. In this Congress, the House of Representatives had the largest number of Republican members, 242, since the 80th Congress (1947–1949). This was the only Congress between the 79th (1945–1947) and the 117th (2021–2023) that did not include a member of the Kennedy family.

As of 2022, this is the most recent Congress in which Democrats held a Senate seat in Nebraska or a House seat in Arkansas, the last in which Republicans held both Senate seats in Maine, and the last in which Democrats did not hold all seats in Connecticut.

Major events

 Social Security Protection Act of 2011
 January 6, 2011: On the second day of the 112th Congress, the House of Representatives read a modified version of the U.S. Constitution, a first.
 January 8, 2011: 2011 Tucson shooting: Representative Gabby Giffords and nineteen other people were shot by a gunman in Tucson, Arizona. Six of them, including a federal judge and a congressional aide, died. Votes on the House floor were suspended for one week.
 January 25, 2011: 2011 State of the Union Address
 March 19, 2011: The United States initiated Operation Odyssey Dawn as part of the international military intervention in the Libyan Civil War. The intervention continued under the auspices of NATO as Operation Unified Protector until the end of military operations in October 2011.
 May 2, 2011: Navy SEALs killed al-Qaeda leader Osama bin Laden in Operation Neptune Spear.
 April 9, 2011: A last-minute deal between both parties averts a partial shutdown of the federal government.
 August 2, 2011: The 2011 debt-ceiling crisis ends with the Budget Control Act of 2011.
 December 18, 2011: The United States completed its withdrawal of troops from Iraq, formally ending the Iraq War.
 January 24, 2012: 2012 State of the Union Address
 June 28, 2012: In National Federation of Independent Business v. Sebelius, the Supreme Court upheld the Affordable Care Act's constitutionality but found the expansion of Medicaid unconstitutionally coercive on the states.
 November 6, 2012: 2012 general elections, including:
 2012 United States House of Representatives elections, in which Democrats gained eight seats, but not enough to retake the majority
 2012 United States Senate elections, in which Democrats gained two seats in their majority
 2012 United States presidential election, in which Barack Obama was re-elected to a second term
 December 14, 2012: The Sandy Hook Elementary School shooting leaves 28 dead, and prompts debate on gun control in the United States.
 January 1, 2013: United States fiscal cliff avoided. (See American Taxpayer Relief Act of 2012)

Potential government shutdown

A failure to pass a 2011 federal budget nearly led to a shutdown of non-essential government services on April 9, 2011, with the furlough of 800,000 government employees appearing imminent. President Obama met Senate Majority Leader Harry Reid and House Speaker John Boehner in the days preceding the deadline but was unable to come to an agreement to pass a budget. A one-week budget was proposed to avoid a government shutdown and allow more time for negotiations; however, proposals from both parties could not be accommodated. Obama said he would veto a proposed Republican budget over Republican social spending cuts. This was also backed by Senate Democrats who objected to such cuts as that of Planned Parenthood. However, an agreement was reached between the two parties for a one-week budget to allow for more time to negotiate after Republicans dropped their stance on the Planned Parenthood issue. The two parties ultimately agreed on a 2011 federal budget the following week.

There were many reactions to the possible shutdown with some saying the economy could be hurt during a fragile recovery and others saying the lack of an unnecessary bureaucracy would not be noticed. There was also criticism that while senators and representatives would continue to get paid others such as the police and military personnel would either not be paid for their work or have their payments deferred.

Debt limit crisis

On August 2, 2011, the United States public debt was projected to reach its statutory maximum.  Without an increase in that limit the U.S. Treasury would be unable to borrow money to pay its bills.  Although previous statutory increases have been routine, conservative members of the House refused to allow an increase without drastically reducing government spending.  Over several weeks and months, negotiators from both parties, both houses, and the White House  worked to forge a compromise.  The compromise bill, the Budget Control Act of 2011, was enacted on August 2.

Major legislation

Enacted

 April 15, 2011: 2011 United States federal budget (as Department of Defense and Full-Year Continuing Appropriations Act, 2011), 
 August 2, 2011: Budget Control Act of 2011, 
 September 16, 2011: Leahy-Smith America Invents Act, 
 October 21, 2011:  United States-Korea Free Trade Agreement Implementation Act, 
 October 21, 2011:  United States-Colombia Trade Promotion Agreement Implementation Act, 
 October 21, 2011:  United States-Panama Trade Promotion Agreement Implementation Act, 
 December 20, 2011: Consolidated Appropriations Act, 2012, Pub.L. 112-74
 December 31, 2011: National Defense Authorization Act for Fiscal Year 2012, 
 February 22, 2012:  Middle Class Tax Relief and Job Creation Act of 2012, 
 March 8, 2012: Federal Restricted Buildings and Grounds Improvement Act of 2011, 
 April 4, 2012: Stop Trading on Congressional Knowledge Act of 2012 (STOCK Act), 
 April 5, 2012: Jumpstart Our Business Startups Act (JOBS Act), 
 May 30, 2012: Export-Import Bank Reauthorization Act of 2012, Pub.L. 112-122
 July 6, 2012: Moving Ahead for Progress in the 21st Century Act (MAP-21 Act), 
 July 9, 2012: Food and Drug Administration Safety and Innovation Act (FDASIA), 
 September 28, 2012: Continuing Appropriations Resolution, 2013, 
 November 27, 2012: Whistleblower Protection Enhancement Act of 2012, 
 November 27, 2012: European Union Emissions Trading Scheme Prohibition Act, Pub.L. 112-200
 December 14, 2012: Magnitsky Act, 
 January 2, 2013: American Taxpayer Relief Act of 2012, 
 January 10, 2013: Katie Sepich Enhanced DNA Collection Act of 2012 (Katie's Law), Pub.L. 111-253

Proposed

 American Jobs Act, 
 Cut, Cap and Balance Act, 
Domestic Fuels Protection Act H.R. 4345
 Federal Reserve Transparency Act, 
 No Taxpayer Funding for Abortion Act, 
 PROTECT IP Act, 
 Protect Life Act, 
 Repealing the Job-Killing Health Care Law Act, 
 Respect for Marriage Act, 
 Stop Online Piracy Act, 
See also: Active Legislation, 112th Congress, via senate.gov

Party summary
Resignations and new members are discussed in the "Changes in membership" section, below.

Senate

House of Representatives

Leadership

Senate

 President: Joe Biden (D)
 President pro tempore: Daniel Inouye (D), until December 17, 2012
 Patrick Leahy (D), from December 17, 2012

Majority (Democratic) leadership
 Majority Leader and Caucus Chair: Harry Reid
 Assistant Majority Leader (Majority Whip): Dick Durbin
 Democratic Caucus Vice Chairman and Policy Committee Chairman: Chuck Schumer
 Senatorial Campaign Committee Chairman and Caucus Secretary: Patty Murray
 Policy Committee Vice Chairman: Debbie Stabenow
 Steering and Outreach Committee Chairman: Mark Begich
 Steering and Outreach Committee Vice Chairman: Daniel Akaka
 Chief Deputy Whip: Barbara Boxer

Minority (Republican) leadership
 Minority Leader: Mitch McConnell
 Assistant Minority Leader (Minority Whip): Jon Kyl
 Republican Conference Chairman: Lamar Alexander, until 2012
 John Thune, from 2012
 Policy Committee Chairman: John Thune, until 2012
 John Barrasso, from 2012
 Republican Conference Vice Chairman: John Barrasso, until 2012
 Roy Blunt, from 2012
 National Senatorial Committee Chair: John Cornyn
 Deputy Whips: Roy Blunt, Richard Burr, Mike Crapo, Saxby Chambliss, Rob Portman, Olympia Snowe, David Vitter, Roger Wicker

House of Representatives

 Speaker: John Boehner (R)

Majority (Republican) leadership
 Majority Leader: Eric Cantor
 Majority Whip: Kevin McCarthy
 Majority Chief Deputy Whip: Peter Roskam
House Rules Committee Chairman: David Dreier
 Republican Conference Chairman: Jeb Hensarling
 Republican Campaign Committee Chairman: Pete Sessions
 Policy Committee Chairman: Tom Price
 Republican Conference Vice-Chairman: Cathy McMorris Rodgers
 Republican Conference Secretary: John Carter
Campaign Committee Deputy Chairman: Greg Walden

Minority (Democratic) leadership
 Minority Leader: Nancy Pelosi
 Minority Whip: Steny Hoyer
 Assistant Democratic Leader: Jim Clyburn
 Senior Chief Deputy Minority Whip: John Lewis
 Chief Deputy Minority Whips: Maxine Waters, Jim Matheson, Ed Pastor, Jan Schakowsky, Joseph Crowley, Diana DeGette, G. K. Butterfield, Debbie Wasserman Schultz, Peter Welch
 Democratic Caucus Chairman: John B. Larson
 Democratic Caucus Vice-Chairman: Xavier Becerra
 Democratic Campaign Committee Chairman: Steve Israel
 Steering/Policy Committee Co-Chairs: Rosa DeLauro and George Miller
 Organization, Study, and Review Chairman: Mike Capuano

Members
For the first time in the history of Congress, over half its members were millionaires as of 2012; Democrats had a median net worth of $1.04 million, while the Republicans median was "almost exactly" $1.00 million. In this Congress, Class 1 meant their term ended with this Congress, requiring reelection in 2012; Class 2 meant their term began in the last Congress, requiring reelection in 2014; and Class 3 meant their term began in this Congress, requiring reelection in 2016.

Senate

Alabama
 2. Jeff Sessions (R)
 3. Richard Shelby (R)

Alaska
 2. Mark Begich (D)
 3. Lisa Murkowski (R)

Arizona
 1. Jon Kyl (R)
 3. John McCain (R)

Arkansas
 2. Mark Pryor (D)
 3. John Boozman (R)

California
 1. Dianne Feinstein (D)
 3. Barbara Boxer (D)

Colorado
 2. Mark Udall (D)
 3. Michael Bennet (D)

Connecticut
 1. Joe Lieberman (I)
 3. Richard Blumenthal (D)

Delaware
 1. Tom Carper (D)
 2. Chris Coons (D)

Florida
 1. Bill Nelson (D)
 3. Marco Rubio (R)

Georgia
 2. Saxby Chambliss (R)
 3. Johnny Isakson (R)

Hawaii
 1. Daniel Akaka (D)
 3. Daniel Inouye (D), until December 17, 2012
 Brian Schatz (D), from December 26, 2012

Idaho
 2. Jim Risch (R)
 3. Mike Crapo (R)

Illinois
 2. Dick Durbin (D)
 3. Mark Kirk (R)

Indiana
 1. Richard Lugar (R)
 3. Dan Coats (R)

Iowa
 2. Tom Harkin (D)
 3. Chuck Grassley (R)

Kansas
 2. Pat Roberts (R)
 3. Jerry Moran (R)

Kentucky
 2. Mitch McConnell (R)
 3. Rand Paul (R)

Louisiana
 2. Mary Landrieu (D)
 3. David Vitter (R)

Maine
 1. Olympia Snowe (R)
 2. Susan Collins (R)

Maryland
 1. Ben Cardin (D)
 3. Barbara Mikulski (D)

Massachusetts
 1. Scott Brown (R)
 2. John Kerry (D)

Michigan
 1. Debbie Stabenow (D)
 2. Carl Levin (D)

Minnesota
 1. Amy Klobuchar (D)
 2. Al Franken (D)

Mississippi
 1. Roger Wicker (R)
 2. Thad Cochran (R)

Missouri
 1. Claire McCaskill (D)
 3. Roy Blunt (R)

Montana
 1. Jon Tester (D)
 2. Max Baucus (D)

Nebraska
 1. Ben Nelson (D)
 2. Mike Johanns (R)

Nevada
 1. John Ensign (R), until May 3, 2011
 Dean Heller (R), from May 9, 2011
 3. Harry Reid (D)

New Hampshire
 2. Jeanne Shaheen (D)
 3. Kelly Ayotte (R)

New Jersey
 1. Bob Menendez (D)
 2. Frank Lautenberg (D)

New Mexico
 1. Jeff Bingaman (D)
 2. Tom Udall (D)

New York
 1. Kirsten Gillibrand (D)
 3. Charles Schumer (D)

North Carolina
 2. Kay Hagan (D)
 3. Richard Burr (R)

North Dakota
 1. Kent Conrad (D-NPL)
 3. John Hoeven (R)

Ohio
 1. Sherrod Brown (D)
 3. Rob Portman (R)

Oklahoma
 2. Jim Inhofe (R)
 3. Tom Coburn (R)

Oregon
 2. Jeff Merkley (D)
 3. Ron Wyden (D)

Pennsylvania
 1. Bob Casey Jr. (D)
 3. Pat Toomey (R)

Rhode Island
 1. Sheldon Whitehouse (D)
 2. Jack Reed (D)

South Carolina
 2. Lindsey Graham (R)
 3. Jim DeMint (R), until January 2, 2013
 Tim Scott (R), from January 2, 2013

South Dakota
 2. Tim Johnson (D)
 3. John Thune (R)

Tennessee
 1. Bob Corker (R)
 2. Lamar Alexander (R)

Texas
 1. Kay Bailey Hutchison (R)
 2. John Cornyn (R)

Utah
 1. Orrin Hatch (R)
 3. Mike Lee (R)

Vermont
 1. Bernie Sanders (I)
 3. Patrick Leahy (D)

Virginia
 1. Jim Webb (D)
 2. Mark Warner (D)

Washington
 1. Maria Cantwell (D)
 3. Patty Murray (D)

West Virginia
 1. Joe Manchin (D)
 2. Jay Rockefeller (D)

Wisconsin
 1. Herb Kohl (D)
 3. Ron Johnson (R)

Wyoming
 1. John Barrasso (R)
 2. Mike Enzi (R)

House of Representatives

Alabama
 . Jo Bonner (R)
 . Martha Roby (R)
 . Mike Rogers (R)
 . Robert Aderholt (R)
 . Mo Brooks (R)
 . Spencer Bachus (R)
 . Terri Sewell (D)

Alaska
 . Don Young (R)

Arizona
 . Paul Gosar (R)
 . Trent Franks (R)
 . Ben Quayle (R)
 . Ed Pastor (D)
 . David Schweikert (R)
 . Jeff Flake (R)
 . Raúl Grijalva (D)
 . Gabby Giffords (D), until January 25, 2012
 Ron Barber (D), from June 12, 2012

Arkansas
 . Rick Crawford (R)
 . Tim Griffin (R)
 . Steve Womack (R)
 . Mike Ross (D)

California
 . Mike Thompson (D)
 . Wally Herger (R)
 . Dan Lungren (R)
 . Tom McClintock (R)
 . Doris Matsui (D)
 . Lynn Woolsey (D)
 . George Miller (D)
 . Nancy Pelosi (D)
 . Barbara Lee (D)
 . John Garamendi (D)
 . Jerry McNerney (D)
 . Jackie Speier (D)
 . Pete Stark (D)
 . Anna Eshoo (D)
 . Mike Honda (D)
 . Zoe Lofgren (D)
 . Sam Farr (D)
 . Dennis Cardoza (D), until August 15, 2012
 Vacant from August 15, 2012
 . Jeff Denham (R)
 . Jim Costa (D)
 . Devin Nunes (R)
 . Kevin McCarthy (R)
 . Lois Capps (D)
 . Elton Gallegly (R)
 . Howard McKeon (R)
 . David Dreier (R)
 . Brad Sherman (D)
 . Howard Berman (D)
 . Adam Schiff (D)
 . Henry Waxman (D)
 . Xavier Becerra (D)
 . Judy Chu (D)
 . Karen Bass (D)
 . Lucille Roybal-Allard (D)
 . Maxine Waters (D)
 . Jane Harman (D), until February 28, 2011
 Janice Hahn (D), from July 12, 2011
 . Laura Richardson (D)
 . Grace Napolitano (D)
 . Linda Sanchez (D)
 . Ed Royce (R)
 . Jerry Lewis (R)
 . Gary Miller (R)
 . Joe Baca (D)
 . Ken Calvert (R)
 . Mary Bono Mack (R)
 . Dana Rohrabacher (R)
 . Loretta Sanchez (D)
 . John Campbell (R)
 . Darrell Issa (R)
 . Brian Bilbray (R)
 . Bob Filner (D), until December 3, 2012
 Vacant from December 3, 2012
 . Duncan D. Hunter (R)
 . Susan Davis (D)

Colorado
 . Diana DeGette (D)
 . Jared Polis (D)
 . Scott Tipton (R)
 . Cory Gardner (R)
 . Doug Lamborn (R)
 . Mike Coffman (R)
 . Ed Perlmutter (D)

Connecticut
 . John Larson (D)
 . Joe Courtney (D)
 . Rosa DeLauro (D)
 . Jim Himes (D)
 . Chris Murphy (D)

Delaware
 . John Carney (D)

Florida
 . Jeff Miller (R)
 . Steve Southerland (R)
 . Corrine Brown (D)
 . Ander Crenshaw (R)
 . Rich Nugent (R)
 . Cliff Stearns (R)
 . John Mica (R)
 . Daniel Webster (R)
 . Gus Bilirakis (R)
 . Bill Young (R)
 . Kathy Castor (D)
 . Dennis Ross (R)
 . Vern Buchanan (R)
 . Connie Mack (R)
 . Bill Posey (R)
 . Tom Rooney (R)
 . Frederica Wilson (D)
 . Ileana Ros-Lehtinen (R)
 . Ted Deutch (D)
 . Debbie Wasserman Schultz (D)
 . Mario Diaz-Balart (R)
 . Allen West (R)
 . Alcee Hastings (D)
 . Sandy Adams (R)
 . David Rivera (R)

Georgia
 . Jack Kingston (R)
 . Sanford Bishop (D)
 . Lynn Westmoreland (R)
 . Hank Johnson (D)
 . John Lewis (D)
 . Tom Price (R)
 . Rob Woodall (R)
 . Austin Scott (R)
 . Tom Graves (R)
 . Paul Broun (R)
 . Phil Gingrey (R)
 . John Barrow (D)
 . David Scott (D)

Hawaii
 . Colleen Hanabusa (D)
 . Mazie Hirono (D)

Idaho
 . Raul Labrador (R)
 . Mike Simpson (R)

Illinois
 . Bobby Rush (D)
 . Jesse Jackson Jr. (D), until November 21, 2012.
 Vacant from November 21, 2012
 . Dan Lipinski (D)
 . Luis Gutierrez (D)
 . Michael Quigley (D)
 . Peter Roskam (R)
 . Danny Davis (D)
 . Joe Walsh (R)
 . Jan Schakowsky (D)
 . Bob Dold (R)
 . Adam Kinzinger (R)
 . Jerry Costello (D)
 . Judy Biggert (R)
 . Randy Hultgren (R)
 . Tim Johnson (R)
 . Don Manzullo (R)
 . Bobby Schilling (R)
 . Aaron Schock (R)
 . John Shimkus (R)

Indiana
 . Pete Visclosky (D)
 . Joe Donnelly (D)
 . Marlin Stutzman (R)
 . Todd Rokita (R)
 . Dan Burton (R)
 . Mike Pence (R)
 . André Carson (D)
 . Larry Bucshon (R)
 . Todd Young (R)

Iowa
 . Bruce Braley (D)
 . David Loebsack (D)
 . Leonard Boswell (D)
 . Tom Latham (R)
 . Steve King (R)

Kansas
 . Tim Huelskamp (R)
 . Lynn Jenkins (R)
 . Kevin Yoder (R)
 . Mike Pompeo (R)

Kentucky
 . Ed Whitfield (R)
 . Brett Guthrie (R)
 . John Yarmuth (D)
 . Geoff Davis (R), until July 31, 2012
 Thomas Massie (R), from November 13, 2012
 . Hal Rogers (R)
 . Ben Chandler (D)

Louisiana
 . Steve Scalise (R)
 . Cedric Richmond (D)
 . Jeff Landry (R)
 . John Fleming (R)
 . Rodney Alexander (R)
 . Bill Cassidy (R)
 . Charles Boustany (R)

Maine
 . Chellie Pingree (D)
 . Mike Michaud (D)

Maryland
 . Andrew Harris (R)
 . Dutch Ruppersberger (D)
 . John Sarbanes (D)
 . Donna Edwards (D)
 . Steny Hoyer (D)
 . Roscoe Bartlett (R)
 . Elijah Cummings (D)
 . Chris Van Hollen (D)

Massachusetts
 . John Olver (D)
 . Richard Neal (D)
 . Jim McGovern (D)
 . Barney Frank (D)
 . Niki Tsongas (D)
 . John Tierney (D)
 . Ed Markey (D)
 . Mike Capuano (D)
 . Stephen Lynch (D)
 . William Keating (D)

Michigan
 . Dan Benishek (R)
 . Bill Huizenga (R)
 . Justin Amash (R)
 . Dave Camp (R)
 . Dale Kildee (D)
 . Fred Upton (R)
 . Tim Walberg (R)
 . Mike Rogers (R)
 . Gary Peters (D)
 . Candice Miller (R)
 . Thaddeus McCotter (R) until July 6, 2012
 David Curson (D) from November 13, 2012
 . Sander Levin (D)
 . Hansen Clarke (D)
 . John Conyers (D)
 . John Dingell (D)

Minnesota
 . Tim Walz (DFL)
 . John Kline (R)
 . Erik Paulsen (R)
 . Betty McCollum (DFL)
 . Keith Ellison (DFL)
 . Michele Bachmann (R)
 . Collin Peterson (DFL)
 . Chip Cravaack (R)

Mississippi
 . Alan Nunnelee (R)
 . Bennie Thompson (D)
 . Gregg Harper (R)
 . Steven Palazzo (R)

Missouri
 . Lacy Clay (D)
 . Todd Akin (R)
 . Russ Carnahan (D)
 . Vicky Hartzler (R)
 . Emanuel Cleaver (D)
 . Sam Graves (R)
 . Bill Long (R)
 . Jo Ann Emerson (R)
 . Blaine Luetkemeyer (R)

Montana
 . Denny Rehberg (R)

Nebraska
 . Jeff Fortenberry (R)
 . Lee Terry (R)
 . Adrian Smith (R)

Nevada
 . Shelley Berkley (D)
 . Dean Heller (R), until May 9, 2011
 Mark Amodei (R), from September 13, 2011
 . Joe Heck (R)

New Hampshire
 . Frank Guinta (R)
 . Charles Bass (R)

New Jersey
 . Rob Andrews (D)
 . Frank LoBiondo (R)
 . Jon Runyan (R)
 . Chris Smith (R)
 . Scott Garrett (R)
 . Frank Pallone (D)
 . Leonard Lance (R)
 . Bill Pascrell (D)
 . Steve Rothman (D)
 . Donald Payne (D), until March 6, 2012
 Donald Payne Jr. (D), from November 15, 2012
 . Rodney Frelinghuysen (R)
 . Rush Holt Jr. (D)
 . Albio Sires (D)

New Mexico
 . Martin Heinrich (D)
 . Steve Pearce (R)
 . Ben Lujan (D)

New York
 . Tim Bishop (D)
 . Steve Israel (D)
 . Peter King (R)
 . Carolyn McCarthy (D)
 . Gary Ackerman (D)
 . Gregory Meeks (D)
 . Joseph Crowley (D)
 . Jerrold Nadler (D)
 . Anthony Weiner (D), until June 21, 2011
 Bob Turner (R), from September 13, 2011
 . Edolphus Towns (D)
 . Yvette Clarke (D)
 . Nydia Velazquez (D)
 . Michael Grimm (R)
 . Carolyn Maloney (D)
 . Charles Rangel (D)
 . José E. Serrano (D)
 . Eliot Engel (D)
 . Nita Lowey (D)
 . Nan Hayworth (R)
 . Chris Gibson (R)
 . Paul Tonko (D)
 . Maurice Hinchey (D)
 . Bill Owens (D)
 . Richard Hanna (R)
 . Ann Marie Buerkle (R)
 . Chris Lee (R), until February 9, 2011
 Kathy Hochul (D), from May 24, 2011
 . Brian Higgins (D)
 . Louise Slaughter (D)
 . Tom Reed (R)

North Carolina
 . G. K. Butterfield (D)
 . Renee Ellmers (R)
 . Walter B. Jones Jr. (R)
 . David Price (D)
 . Virginia Foxx (R)
 . Howard Coble (R)
 . Mike McIntyre (D)
 . Larry Kissell (D)
 . Sue Myrick (R)
 . Patrick McHenry (R)
 . Heath Shuler (D)
 . Mel Watt (D)
 . Brad Miller (D)

North Dakota
 . Rick Berg (R)

Ohio
 . Steve Chabot (R)
 . Jean Schmidt (R)
 . Mike Turner (R)
 . Jim Jordan (R)
 . Bob Latta (R)
 . Bill Johnson (R)
 . Steve Austria (R)
 . John Boehner (R)
 . Marcy Kaptur (D)
 . Dennis Kucinich (D)
 . Marcia Fudge (D)
 . Pat Tiberi (R)
 . Betty Sutton (D)
 . Steve LaTourette (R)
 . Steve Stivers (R)
 . Jim Renacci (R)
 . Tim Ryan (D)
 . Bob Gibbs (R)

Oklahoma
 . John Sullivan (R)
 . Dan Boren (D)
 . Frank Lucas (R)
 . Tom Cole (R)
 . James Lankford (R)

Oregon
 . David Wu (D), until August 3, 2011
 Suzanne Bonamici (D), from January 31, 2012
 . Greg Walden (R)
 . Earl Blumenauer (D)
 . Peter DeFazio (D)
 . Kurt Schrader (D)

Pennsylvania
 . Bob Brady (D)
 . Chaka Fattah (D)
 . Mike Kelly (R)
 . Jason Altmire (D)
 . Glenn Thompson (R)
 . Jim Gerlach (R)
 . Pat Meehan (R)
 . Mike Fitzpatrick (R)
 . Bill Shuster (R)
 . Tom Marino (R)
 . Lou Barletta (R)
 . Mark Critz (D)
 . Allyson Schwartz (D)
 . Michael Doyle (D)
 . Charlie Dent (R)
 . Joseph Pitts (R)
 . Tim Holden (D)
 . Timothy Murphy (R)
 . Todd Platts (R)

Rhode Island
 . David Cicilline (D)
 . James Langevin (D)

South Carolina
 . Tim Scott (R), until January 2, 2013
 Vacant from January 2, 2013
 . Joe Wilson (R)
 . Jeff Duncan (R)
 . Trey Gowdy (R)
 . Mick Mulvaney (R)
 . Jim Clyburn (D)

South Dakota
 . Kristi Noem (R)

Tennessee
 . Phil Roe (R)
 . Jimmy Duncan (R)
 . Chuck Fleischmann (R)
 . Scott DesJarlais (R)
 . Jim Cooper (D)
 . Diane Black (R)
 . Marsha Blackburn (R)
 . Stephen Fincher (R)
 . Steve Cohen (D)

Texas
 . Louie Gohmert (R)
 . Ted Poe (R)
 . Sam Johnson (R)
 . Ralph Hall (R)
 . Jeb Hensarling (R)
 . Joe Barton (R)
 . John Culberson (R)
 . Kevin Brady (R)
 . Al Green (D)
 . Michael McCaul (R)
 . Mike Conaway (R)
 . Kay Granger (R)
 . Mac Thornberry (R)
 . Ron Paul (R)
 . Ruben Hinojosa (D)
 . Silvestre Reyes (D)
 . Bill Flores (R)
 . Sheila Jackson Lee (D)
 . Randy Neugebauer (R)
 . Charlie Gonzalez (D)
 . Lamar Smith (R)
 . Pete Olson (R)
 . Quico Canseco (R)
 . Kenny Marchant (R)
 . Lloyd Doggett (D)
 . Michael Burgess (R)
 . Blake Farenthold (R)
 . Henry Cuellar (D)
 . Gene Green (D)
 . Eddie Bernice Johnson (D)
 . John Carter (R)
 . Pete Sessions (R)

Utah
 . Rob Bishop (R)
 . Jim Matheson (D)
 . Jason Chaffetz (R)

Vermont
 . Peter Welch (D)

Virginia
 . Rob Wittman (R)
 . Scott Rigell (R)
 . Bobby Scott (D)
 . Randy Forbes (R)
 . Robert Hurt (R)
 . Bob Goodlatte (R)
 . Eric Cantor (R)
 . Jim Moran (D)
 . Morgan Griffith (R)
 . Frank Wolf (R)
 . Gerry Connolly (D)

Washington
 . Jay Inslee (D), until March 20, 2012
 Suzan DelBene (D), from November 13, 2012
 . Rick Larsen (D)
 . Jaime Herrera Beutler (R)
 . Doc Hastings (R)
 . Cathy McMorris Rodgers (R)
 . Norman Dicks (D)
 . Jim McDermott (D)
 . Dave Reichert (R)
 . Adam Smith (D)

West Virginia
 . David McKinley (R)
 . Shelley Moore Capito (R)
 . Nick Rahall (D)

Wisconsin
 . Paul Ryan (R)
 . Tammy Baldwin (D)
 . Ron Kind (D)
 . Gwen Moore (D)
 . Jim Sensenbrenner (R)
 . Tom Petri (R)
 . Sean Duffy (R)
 . Reid Ribble (R)

Wyoming
 . Cynthia Lummis (R)

Non-voting members
 . Eni Faleomavaega (D)
 . Eleanor Holmes Norton (D)
 . Madeleine Bordallo (D)
 . Gregorio Sablan (D)
 . Pedro Pierluisi (Resident Commissioner) (D/NPP)
 . Donna Christian-Christensen (D)

Changes in membership

Senate

|-
| Nevada(1)
| nowrap  | John Ensign(R)
| Resigned May 3, 2011, due to an Ethics Committee investigation.Successor appointed April 27, 2011 and later elected for a full six-year term.
| nowrap  | Dean Heller(R)
| May 9, 2011

|-
| Hawaii(3)
| nowrap  | Daniel Inouye(D)
| Died December 17, 2012 Successor appointed December 26, 2012, to serve until a special election was held to finish the term ending January 3, 2017.
| nowrap  | Brian Schatz(D)
| December 27, 2012

|-
| South Carolina(3)
| nowrap  | Jim DeMint(R)
| Resigned January 1, 2013, to run the Heritage FoundationSuccessor appointed January 2, 2013, to serve until a special election was held to finish the term ending January 3, 2017.
| nowrap  | Tim Scott(R)
| January 2, 2013
|}

House of Representatives

|-
| 
| nowrap  | Christopher Lee(R)
| style="font-size:80%" | Resigned February 9, 2011, due to a personal scandal.A special election was held May 24, 2011.
| nowrap  | Kathy Hochul(D)
| June 1, 2011

|-
| 
| nowrap  | Jane Harman(D)
| style="font-size:80%" | Resigned February 28, 2011, to become the head of the Woodrow Wilson Center.A special election was held July 12, 2011.
| nowrap  | Janice Hahn(D)
| July 19, 2011
|-
| 
| nowrap  | Dean Heller(R)
| style="font-size:80%" | Resigned May 9, 2011, when appointed to the Senate.A special election was held September 13, 2011.
| nowrap  | Mark Amodei(R)
| September 15, 2011
|-
| 
| nowrap  | Anthony Weiner(D)
|  style="font-size:80%" | Resigned June 21, 2011, due to a personal scandal.A special election was held September 13, 2011.
| nowrap  | Bob Turner(R)
| September 15, 2011

|-
| 
| nowrap  | David Wu(D)
| style="font-size:80%" | Resigned August 3, 2011, due to a personal scandal.A special election was held January 31, 2012.
|  | Suzanne Bonamici(D)
| February 7, 2012

|-
| 
| nowrap  | Gabby Giffords(D)
| style="font-size:80%" | Resigned January 25, 2012, to focus on recovery from 2011 Tucson shooting. A special election was held June 12, 2012.
|  | Ron Barber(D)
| June 19, 2012

|-
| 
| nowrap  | Donald M. Payne(D)
| style="font-size:80%" | Died March 6, 2012.A special election was held November 6, 2012.
|  | Donald Payne Jr.(D)
| November 15, 2012

|-
| 
| nowrap  | Jay Inslee(D)
| style="font-size:80%" | Resigned March 20, 2012, to focus on gubernatorial campaign.A special election was held November 6, 2012.
|  | Suzan DelBene(D)
| November 13, 2012

|-
| 
| nowrap  | Thaddeus McCotter(R)
| style="font-size:80%" | Resigned July 6, 2012, due to personal reasons.A special election was held November 6, 2012.
|  | David Curson(D)
| November 13, 2012

|-
| 
| nowrap  | Geoff Davis(R)
| style="font-size:80%" | Resigned July 31, 2012, due to personal reasons. A special election was held November 6, 2012.
|  | Thomas Massie(R)
| November 13, 2012

|-
| 
| nowrap  | Dennis Cardoza(D)
| style="font-size:80%" | Resigned August 15, 2012, due to personal reasons.
| colspan=2 rowspan=4| Vacant until the next Congress
|-
| 
| nowrap  | Jesse Jackson Jr.(D)
| style="font-size:80%" | Resigned November 21, 2012, due to a personal scandal.
|-
| 
| nowrap  | Bob Filner(D)
| style="font-size:80%" | Resigned December 3, 2012, to become Mayor of San Diego.
|-
| 
| nowrap  | Tim Scott(R)
| style="font-size:80%" | Resigned January 2, 2013, when appointed to the United States Senate.
|}

Committees 
[ Section contents: Senate, House, Joint ]

Senate 

 Agriculture, Nutrition and Forestry— Chair: Debbie Stabenow, Ranking: Pat Roberts
 Commodities, Markets, Trade and Risk Management— Chair: Ben Nelson, Ranking: Saxby Chambliss
 Conservation, Forestry and Natural Resources— Chair: Michael Bennet, Ranking: John Boozman
 Jobs, Rural Economic Growth and Energy Innovation— Chair: Sherrod Brown, Ranking: John Thune
 Livestock, Dairy, Poultry, Marketing and Agriculture Security— Chair: Kirsten Gillibrand, Ranking: Mike Johanns
 Nutrition, Specialty Crops, Food and Agricultural Research— Chair: Bob Casey Jr., Ranking: Richard Lugar
 Aging (Special)— Chair: Herb Kohl, Ranking: Bob Corker
 Appropriations— Chair: Daniel Inouye, Ranking: Thad Cochran
 Agriculture, Rural Development, Food and Drug Administration, and Related Agencies— Chair: Herb Kohl, Ranking: Roy Blunt
 Commerce, Justice, Science, and Related Agencies— Chair: Barbara Mikulski, Ranking: Kay Bailey Hutchison
 Defense— Chair: Daniel Inouye, Ranking: Thad Cochran
 Energy and Water Development— Chair: Dianne Feinstein, Ranking: Lamar Alexander
 Financial Services and General Government— Chair: Richard Durbin, Ranking: Jerry Moran
 Homeland Security— Chair: Mary Landrieu, Ranking: Dan Coats
 Interior, Environment, and Related Agencies— Chair: Jack Reed, Ranking: Lisa Murkowski
 Labor, Health and Human Services, Education, and Related Agencies— Chair: Tom Harkin, Ranking: Richard Shelby
 Legislative Branch— Chair: Ben Nelson, Ranking: John Hoeven
 Military Construction, Veterans Affairs, and Related Agencies— Chair: Tim Johnson, Ranking: Mark Kirk
 State, Foreign Operations, and Related Programs— Chair: Patrick Leahy, Ranking: Lindsey Graham
 Transportation, Housing and Urban Development, and Related Agencies— Chair: Patty Murray, Ranking: Susan Collins
 Armed Services— Chair: Carl Levin, Ranking: John McCain
 Airland— Chair: Joe Lieberman, Ranking: Scott Brown
 Emerging Threats and Capabilities— Chair: Kay Hagan, Ranking: Rob Portman
 Personnel— Chair: Jim Webb, Ranking: Lindsey Graham
 Readiness and Management Support— Chair: Claire McCaskill, Ranking: Kelly Ayotte
 SeaPower— Chair: Jack Reed, Ranking: Roger Wicker
 Strategic Forces— Chair: Ben Nelson, Ranking: Jeff Sessions
 Banking, Housing, and Urban Affairs— Chair: Tim Johnson, Ranking: Richard Shelby
 Economic Policy— Chair: Jon Tester, Ranking: David Vitter
 Financial Institutions and Consumer Protection— Chair: Sherrod Brown, Ranking: Bob Corker
 Housing, Transportation, and Community Development— Chair: Robert Menendez, Ranking: Jim DeMint
 Securities, Insurance, and Investment— Chair: Jack Reed, Ranking: Mike Crapo
 Security and International Trade and Finance— Chair: Mark Warner, Ranking: Mike Johanns
 Budget— Chair: Kent Conrad, Ranking: Jeff Sessions
 Commerce, Science and Transportation— Chair: Jay Rockefeller, Ranking: Kay Bailey Hutchison
 Aviation Operations, Safety, and Security— Chair: Maria Cantwell, Ranking: John Thune
 Communications, Technology, and the Internet— Chair: John Kerry, Ranking: John Ensign, then Jim DeMint
 Competitiveness, Innovation, and Export Promotion— Chair: Amy Klobuchar, Ranking: Roy Blunt
 Consumer Protection, Product Safety, and Insurance— Chair: Mark Pryor, Ranking: Pat Toomey
 Oceans, Atmosphere, Fisheries, and Coast Guard— Chair: Mark Begich, Ranking: Olympia Snowe
 Science and Space— Chair: Bill Nelson, Ranking: John Boozman
 Surface Transportation and Merchant Marine Infrastructure, Safety, and Security— Chair: Frank Lautenberg, Ranking: Roger Wicker
 Energy and Natural Resources— Chair: Jeff Bingaman, Ranking: Lisa Murkowski
 Energy— Chair: Maria Cantwell, Ranking: Jim Risch
 National Parks— Chair: Mark Udall, Ranking: Richard Burr
 Public Lands and Forests— Chair: Ron Wyden, Ranking: John Barrasso
 Water and Power— Chair: Debbie Stabenow, Ranking: Mike Lee

 Environment and Public Works— Chair: Barbara Boxer, Ranking: Jim Inhofe
 Children's Health and Environmental Responsibility— Chair: Amy Klobuchar, Ranking: Lamar Alexander
 Clean Air and Nuclear Safety— Chair: Tom Carper, Ranking: John Barrasso
 Green Jobs and the New Economy— Chair: Bernie Sanders, Ranking: John Boozman
 Oversight— Chair: Sheldon Whitehouse, Ranking: Mike Johanns
 Superfund, Toxics and Environmental Health— Chair: Frank Lautenberg, Ranking: Mike Crapo
 Transportation and Infrastructure— Chair: Max Baucus, Ranking: David Vitter
 Water and Wildlife— Chair: Ben Cardin, Ranking: Jeff Sessions
 Ethics (Select)— Chair: Barbara Boxer, Ranking: Johnny Isakson
 Finance— Chair: Max Baucus, Ranking: Orrin Hatch
 Energy, Natural Resources, and Infrastructure— Chair: Jeff Bingaman, Ranking: John Cornyn
 Fiscal Responsibility and Economic Growth— Chair: Bill Nelson, Ranking: Mike Crapo
 Health Care— Chair: Jay Rockefeller, Ranking: John Ensign, then Chuck Grassley
 International Trade, Customs, and Global Competitiveness— Chair: Ron Wyden, Ranking: John Thune
 Social Security, Pensions, and Family Policy— Chair: Debbie Stabenow, Ranking: Tom Coburn
 Taxation and IRS Oversight— Chair: Kent Conrad, Ranking: Jon Kyl
 Foreign Relations— Chair: John Kerry, Ranking: Richard Lugar
 Western Hemisphere, Peace Corps and Narcotics Affairs— Chair: Robert Menendez, Ranking: Marco Rubio
 Near Eastern and South and Central Asian Affairs— Chair: Bob Casey Jr., Ranking: Jim Risch
 African Affairs— Chair: Chris Coons, Ranking: Johnny Isakson
 East Asian and Pacific Affairs— Chair: Jim Webb, Ranking: James Inhofe
 International Operations and Organizations, Human Rights, Democracy and Global Women's Issues— Chair: Barbara Boxer, Ranking: Jim DeMint
 European Affairs— Chair: Jeanne Shaheen, Ranking: John Barrasso
 International Development and Foreign Assistance, Economic Affairs, and International Environmental Protection— Chair: Ben Cardin, Ranking: Bob Corker
 Health, Education, Labor, and Pensions— Chair: Tom Harkin, Ranking: Mike Enzi
 Subcommittee on Children and Families— Chair: Patty Murray, Ranking: Richard Burr
 Subcommittee on Employment and Workplace Safety— Chair: Barbara Mikulski, Ranking: Johnny Isakson
 Subcommittee on Primary Health and Aging— Chair: Bernie Sanders, Ranking: Rand Paul
 Homeland Security and Governmental Affairs— Chair: Joe Lieberman, Ranking: Susan Collins
 Contracting Oversight (Ad Hoc)— Chair: Claire McCaskill, Ranking: Rob Portman
 Disaster Recovery and Intergovernmental Affairs (Ad Hoc)— Chair: Mark Pryor, Ranking: John Ensign, then Rand Paul
 Federal Financial Management, Government Information and International Security— Chair: Thomas Carper, Ranking: Scott Brown
 Investigations (Permanent)— Chair: Carl Levin, Ranking: Tom Coburn
 Oversight of Government Management, the Federal Workforce and the District of Columbia— Chair: Daniel Akaka, Ranking: Ron Johnson
 Indian Affairs— Chair: Daniel Akaka, Ranking: John Barrasso
 Intelligence (Select)— Chair: Dianne Feinstein, Ranking: Saxby Chambliss
 Judiciary— Chair: Patrick Leahy, Ranking: Chuck Grassley
 Administrative Oversight and the Courts— Chair: Amy Klobuchar, Ranking: Jeff Sessions
 Antitrust, Competition Policy and Consumer Rights— Chair: Herb Kohl, Ranking: Mike Lee
 The Constitution, Civil Rights and Human Rights— Chair: Dick Durbin, Ranking: Lindsey Graham
 Crime and Terrorism— Chair: Sheldon Whitehouse, Ranking: Jon Kyl
 Immigration, Refugees and Border Security— Chair: Chuck Schumer, Ranking: John Cornyn
 Privacy, Technology and the Law— Chair: Al Franken, Ranking: Tom Coburn
 Rules and Administration— Chair: Chuck Schumer, Ranking: Lamar Alexander
 Small Business and Entrepreneurship— Chair: Mary Landrieu, Ranking: Olympia Snowe
 Veterans' Affairs— Chair: Patty Murray, Ranking: Richard Burr

House of Representatives 

 Agriculture— Chair: Frank Lucas, Ranking: Collin C. Peterson
 Conservation, Energy, and Forestry— Chair: Glenn Thompson, Ranking: Tim Holden
 Department Operations, Oversight, and Credit— Chair: Jeff Fortenberry, Ranking: Marcia Fudge
 General Farm Commodities and Risk Management— Chair: Mike Conaway, Ranking: Leonard Boswell
 Livestock, Dairy, and Poultry— Chair: Tom Rooney, Ranking: Dennis Cardoza
 Nutrition and Horticulture— Chair: Jean Schmidt, Ranking: Joe Baca
 Rural Development, Research, Biotechnology, and Foreign Agriculture— Chair: Timothy V. Johnson, Ranking: Jim Costa
 Appropriations— Chair: Hal Rogers, Ranking: Norm Dicks
 Agriculture, Rural Development, Food and Drug Administration, and Related Agencies— Chair: Jack Kingston, Ranking: Sam Farr
 Commerce, Justice, Science, and Related Agencies— Chair: Frank Wolf, Ranking: Chaka Fattah
 Defense— Chair: Bill Young, Ranking: Norm Dicks
 Energy and Water Development— Chair: Rodney Frelinghuysen, Ranking: Pete Visclosky
 Financial Services and General Government— Chair: Jo Ann Emerson, Ranking: José E. Serrano
 Homeland Security— Chair: Robert Aderholt, Ranking: David Price
 Interior, Environment, and Related Agencies— Chair: Mike Simpson, Ranking: Jim Moran
 Labor, Health and Human Services, Education, and Related Agencies— Chair: Denny Rehberg, Ranking: Rosa DeLauro
 Legislative Branch— Chair: Ander Crenshaw, Ranking: Mike Honda
 Military Construction, Veterans Affairs, and Related Agencies— Chair: John Culberson, Ranking: Sanford Bishop
 State, Foreign Operations, and Related Programs— Chair: Kay Granger, Ranking: Nita Lowey
 Transportation, Housing and Urban Development, and Related Agencies— Chair: Tom Latham, Ranking: John Olver
 Armed Services— Chair: Buck McKeon, Ranking: Adam Smith
 Emerging Threats and Capabilities— Chair: Mac Thornberry, Ranking: Jim Langevin
 Military Personnel— Chair: Joe Wilson, Ranking: Susan Davis
 Oversight and Investigations— Chair: Rob Wittman, Ranking: Jim Cooper
 Readiness— Chair: Randy Forbes, Ranking: Madeleine Bordallo
 Seapower and Projection Forces— Chair: Todd Akin, Ranking: Mike McIntyre
 Strategic Forces— Chair: Mike Turner, Ranking: Loretta Sanchez
 Tactical Air and Land Forces— Chair: Roscoe Bartlett, Ranking: Silvestre Reyes
 Budget— Chair: Paul Ryan, Ranking: Chris Van Hollen
 Education and the Workforce— Chair: John Kline, Ranking: George Miller
 Early Childhood, Elementary and Secondary Education— Chair: Duncan D. Hunter, Ranking: Dale Kildee
 Health, Employment, Labor, and Pensions— Chair: Phil Roe, Ranking: Rob Andrews
 Higher Education and Workforce Training— Chair: Virginia Foxx, Ranking: Ruben Hinojosa
 Workforce Protections— Chair: Tim Walberg, Ranking: Lynn Woolsey
 Energy and Commerce— Chair: Fred Upton, Ranking: Henry Waxman
 Commerce, Manufacturing and Trade— Chair: Mary Bono Mack, Ranking: G. K. Butterfield
 Communications and Technology— Chair: Greg Walden, Ranking: Anna Eshoo
 Energy and Power— Chair: Ed Whitfield, Ranking: Bobby Rush
 Environment and the Economy— Chair: John Shimkus, Ranking: Gene Green
 Health— Chair: Joe Pitts, Ranking: Frank Pallone
 Oversight and Investigations— Chair: Cliff Stearns, Ranking: Diana DeGette
 Ethics— Chair: Jo Bonner, Ranking: Linda Sanchez
 Financial Services— Chair: Spencer Bachus, Ranking: Barney Frank
 Capital Markets and Government-Sponsored Enterprises— Chair: Scott Garrett, Ranking: Maxine Waters
 Domestic Monetary Policy and Technology— Chair: Ron Paul, Ranking: Lacy Clay
 Financial Institutions and Consumer Credit— Chair: Shelley Moore Capito, Ranking: Carolyn B. Maloney
 Insurance, Housing and Community Opportunity— Chair: Judy Biggert, Ranking: Luis Gutierrez
 International Monetary Policy and Trade— Chair: Gary Miller, Ranking: Carolyn McCarthy
 Oversight and Investigations— Chair: Randy Neugebauer, Ranking: Michael Capuano
 Foreign Affairs— Chair: Ileana Ros-Lehtinen, Ranking: Howard Berman
 Africa, Global Health, and Human Rights— Chair: Chris Smith, Ranking: Donald Payne, then Karen Bass
 Asia and the Pacific— Chair: Donald A. Manzullo, Ranking: Eni Faleomavaega
 Europe and Eurasia— Chair: Dan Burton, Ranking: Gregory Meeks
 Middle East and South Asia— Chair: Steve Chabot, Ranking: Gary Ackerman
 Oversight and Investigations— Chair: Dana Rohrabacher, Ranking: Russ Carnahan
 Terrorism, Nonproliferation, and Trade— Chair: Ed Royce, Ranking: Brad Sherman
 Western Hemisphere— Chair: Connie Mack IV, Ranking: Eliot Engel
 Homeland Security— Chair: Peter T. King, Ranking: Bennie Thompson
 Border and Maritime Security— Chair: Candice Miller, Ranking: Henry Cuellar
 Emergency Preparedness, Response, and Communications— Chair: Gus Bilirakis, Ranking: Laura Richardson
 Cybersecurity, Infrastructure Protection, and Security Technologies— Chair: Dan Lungren, Ranking: Yvette Clarke
 Counterterrorism and Intelligence— Chair: Pat Meehan, Ranking: Jane Harman, then Jackie Speier
 Oversight, Investigations, and Management— Chair: Michael McCaul, Ranking: William R. Keating
 Transportation Security— Chair: Mike D. Rogers, Ranking: Sheila Jackson Lee

 House Administration— Chair: Dan Lungren, Ranking: Bob Brady
 Oversight— Chair: Phil Gingrey, Ranking: Zoe Lofgren
 Elections— Chair: Gregg Harper, Ranking: Charlie Gonzalez
 Intelligence (Permanent Select)— Chair: Mike Rogers, Ranking: Dutch Ruppersberger
 Oversight— Chair: Lynn Westmoreland, Ranking: Jan Schakowsky
 Technical and Tactical Intelligence— Chair: Joe Heck, Ranking: Adam Schiff
 Terrorism, HUMINT, Analysis and Counterintelligence— Chair: Sue Myrick, Ranking: Mike Thompson
 Judiciary— Chair: Lamar S. Smith, Ranking: John Conyers
 Courts, Commercial and Administrative Law— Chair: Howard Coble, Ranking: Steve Cohen
 Constitution— Chair: Trent Franks, Ranking: Jerrold Nadler
 Intellectual Property, Competition, and the Internet— Chair: Bob Goodlatte, Ranking: Mel Watt
 Crime, Terrorism, and Homeland Security— Chair: Jim Sensenbrenner, Ranking: Bobby Scott
 Immigration Policy and Enforcement— Chair: Elton Gallegly, Ranking: Zoe Lofgren
 Natural Resources— Chair: Doc Hastings, Ranking: Ed Markey
 Energy and Mineral Resources— Chair: Doug Lamborn, Ranking: Rush D. Holt
 Fisheries, Wildlife, Oceans and Insular Affairs— Chair: John Fleming, Ranking: Donna Christensen
 Indian and Alaska Native Affairs— Chair: Don Young, Ranking: Dan Boren
 National Parks, Forests and Public Lands— Chair: Rob Bishop, Ranking: Raúl Grijalva
 Water and Power— Chair: Tom McClintock, Ranking: Grace Napolitano
 Oversight and Government Reform— Chair: Darrell Issa, Ranking: Elijah Cummings
 Federal Workforce, U.S. Postal Service and Labor Policy— Chair: Dennis A. Ross, Ranking: Stephen Lynch
 Government Organization, Efficiency and Financial Management— Chair: Todd Platts, Ranking: Ed Towns
 Health Care, District of Columbia, Census and the National Archives— Chair: Trey Gowdy, Ranking: Danny K. Davis
 National Security, Homeland Defense and Foreign Operations— Chair: Jason Chaffetz, Ranking: John F. Tierney
 Regulatory Affairs, Stimulus Oversight and Government Spending— Chair: Jim Jordan, Ranking: Dennis Kucinich
 TARP, Financial Services and Bailouts of Public and Private Programs— Chair: Patrick McHenry, Ranking: Michael Quigley
 Technology, Information Policy, Intergovernmental Relations and Procurement Reform— Chair: James Lankford, Ranking: Gerry Connolly
 Rules— Chair: David Dreier, Ranking: Louise Slaughter
 Legislative and Budget Process— Chair: Pete Sessions, Ranking: Alcee Hastings
 Rules and the Organization of the House— Chair: Rich Nugent, Ranking: Jim McGovern
 Science, Space and Technology— Chair: Ralph Hall, Ranking: Eddie Bernice Johnson
 Space and Aeronautics— Chair: Steven Palazzo, Ranking: Gabby Giffords, then Jerry Costello
 Technology and Innovation— Chair: Ben Quayle, Ranking: David Wu, then Donna Edwards
 Research and Science Education— Chair: Mo Brooks, Ranking: Dan Lipinski
 Investigations and Oversight— Chair: Paul Broun, Ranking: Donna Edwards
 Energy and Environment— Chair: Andy Harris, Ranking: Brad Miller
 Small Business— Chair: Sam Graves, Ranking: Nydia Velazquez
 Agriculture, Energy and Trade— Chair: Scott Tipton, Ranking: Mark Critz
 Healthcare and Technology— Chair: Renee Ellmers, Ranking: Cedric Richmond
 Economic Growth, Tax and Capital Access— Chair: Joe Walsh, Ranking: Kurt Schrader
 Contracting and Workforce— Chair: Mick Mulvaney, Ranking: Judy Chu
 Investigations, Oversight and Regulations— Chair: Mike Coffman, Ranking: Jason Altmire
 Transportation and Infrastructure— Chair: John Mica, Ranking: Nick Rahall
 Aviation— Chair: Thomas Petri, Ranking: Jerry Costello
 Coast Guard and Maritime Transportation— Chair: Frank LoBiondo, Ranking: Rick Larsen
 Economic Development, Public Buildings and Emergency Management— Chair: Jeff Denham, Ranking: Eleanor Holmes Norton
 Highways and Transit— Chair: Jimmy Duncan, Ranking: Peter DeFazio
 Railroads, Pipelines, and Hazardous Materials— Chair: Bill Shuster, Ranking: Corrine Brown
 Water Resources and Environment— Chair: Bob Gibbs, Ranking: Tim Bishop
 Veterans' Affairs— Chair: Jeff Miller, Ranking: Bob Filner
 Disability Assistance and Memorial Affairs— Chair: Jon Runyan, Ranking: Jerry McNerney
 Economic Opportunity— Chair: Marlin Stutzman, Ranking: Bruce Braley
 Health— Chair: Ann Marie Buerkle, Ranking: Mike Michaud
 Oversight and Investigations— Chair: Bill Johnson, Ranking: Joe Donnelly
 Ways and Means— Chair: Dave Camp, Ranking: Sander Levin
 Health— Chair: Wally Herger, Ranking: Pete Stark
 Human Resources— Chair: Geoff Davis, Ranking: Lloyd Doggett
 Oversight— Chair: Charles Boustany, Ranking: John Lewis
 Select Revenue Measures— Chair: Pat Tiberi, Ranking: Richard Neal
 Social Security— Chair: Sam Johnson, Ranking: Xavier Becerra
 Trade— Chair: Kevin Brady, Ranking: Jim McDermott
 Whole

Joint appointments 

 Deficit Reduction (Select)— Co-chairs: Rep. Jeb Hensarling (R), Sen. Patty Murray (D)
 Economic— Chair: Sen. Bob Casey Jr. (D), Ranking: Rep. Kevin Brady (R)
 Inaugural Ceremonies (Special)— Chair: Sen. Chuck Schumer (D), Ranking: Sen. Lamar Alexander (R)
 The Library— Chair: Sen. Chuck Schumer (D), Ranking: Rep. Gregg Harper (R)
 Printing— Chair: Rep. Gregg Harper (R), Ranking: Sen. Chuck Schumer (D)
 Taxation— Chair: Rep. Dave Camp (R), Ranking: Sen. Max Baucus (D)

Caucuses

Employees

Legislative branch agency directors
 Architect of the Capitol: Stephen T. Ayers
 Attending Physician of the United States Congress: Brian Monahan
 Comptroller General of the United States: Eugene Louis Dodaro
 Director of the Congressional Budget Office: Douglas W. Elmendorf
 Librarian of Congress: James H. Billington
 Public Printer of the United States: William J. Boarman, until January 3, 2012 
 Davita Vance-Cooks, from January 3, 2012

Senate
Chaplain: Barry C. Black (Seventh-day Adventist)
Curator: Diane K. Skvarla
Historian: Richard A. Baker
Parliamentarian: Alan Frumin, until February 2, 2012
 Elizabeth MacDonough, from February 2, 2012
Secretary: Nancy Erickson
Sergeant at Arms: Terrance W. Gainer
Secretary for the Majority: Gary B. Myrick
Secretary for the Minority: David J. Schiappa

House of Representatives
Chaplain: Daniel Coughlin (Roman Catholic), until April 14, 2011
 Patrick J. Conroy (Roman Catholic), from May 25, 2011
Chief Administrative Officer: Daniel J. Strodel
Clerk: Karen L. Haas
Historian: Matthew Wasniewski
Parliamentarian: John V. Sullivan, until 2012
 Thomas Wickham Jr., from 2012
Reading Clerks: Susan Cole and Joseph Novotny
Sergeant at Arms: Wilson Livingood, until January 17, 2012
 Paul D. Irving from January 17, 2012 
Inspector General: Theresa M. Grafenstine

See also
Do Not Ask What Good We Do

Elections
 2010 United States elections (elections held in advance of this Congress)
 2010 United States Senate elections
 2010 United States House of Representatives elections
 2012 United States elections (elections to be held during this Congress)
 2012 United States presidential election
 2012 United States Senate elections
 2012 United States House of Representatives elections

Membership lists
 List of new members of the 112th United States Congress
 Members of the 112th United States Congress

Notes

References

Further reading
Aftershock: The 112th Congress and Post-Crisis Asia by Edward Gresser and Daniel Twining (National Bureau of Asian Research, 2011)

External links
Biographical Directory of the U.S. Congress
112th Congress Congress.gov at the Library of Congress
Member Information, via U.S. House of Representatives
Statistics and Lists, via U.S. Senate
 Congressional Directory: Main Page, Government Printing Office Online. Detailed listings of many aspects of current & previous memberships and sessions of Congress.
Collected coverage  on C-SPAN